Jamie Lidell is an album by Jamie Lidell released in 2013 and produced by Lidell and Justin Stanley in Lidell's Nashville, Tennessee studio. The lead single, "What a Shame," was released on YouTube on Nov 16, 2012.

Lidell cited Janet Jackson as the inspiration for the album, saying "I got into 'Rhythm Nation' and 'Control' and thought 'these are amazing songs, why don't they make them like this anymore? I want to make them like that!' So that's what kicked it off for me." Lidell added, "it’s the sound of the era I was going for, that [Janet Jackson] 'Rhythm Nation' vocal sound.”

Reception 

Consequence of Sound ranked the album four out of five stars, while Pitchfork gave the album a mediocre review. The album's blend of synthesized electropop and "futuristic" industrial music was praised and likened to Janet Jackson's 1986 album Control by About.com. The electronic drum intro of "Big Love" was also described as reminiscent of Jackson's hit "The Pleasure Principle."

Spin gave the album an 8 out of 10, "Though the Minneapolis Sound is new territory for Lidell, he capably imports the dweeby, self-doubting, cyborg-Lothario persona that made Multiply a hit, now with enough confidence that a song like "You Naked" hits a bullseye that earlier incarnations would’ve missed".

Track listing
I'm Selfish - 4:54
Big Love - 4:44
What a Shame - 4:37
Do Yourself a Faver - 4:07
You Naked - 4:48
why_ya_why - 3:32
Blaming Something - 4:40
You Know My Name - 4:18
So Cold - 3:56
Don't You Love Me - 4:16
In Your Mind - 4:25

Personnel 
Jamie Lidell: Vocals, vocal loops, guitar, bass, synth, synth programming, piano, horns, drum programming, percussion
Justin Stanley: Guitar, bass, synth, drums, percussion, drum programming, horns
James Rowland: Guitar, bass, synth, keyboards, guitar synthesizer, horns, talkbox
(Lucky) Paul Taylor: Drums, percussion
Brian LeBarton: Synth, bass
Jamison Sevitts: Trumpet, tuba
Jake Aron: Guitar
André Vida: Synth
Jeff Lorber: Piano
Matt Sherrod: Drums
Matt Chamberlain: Drums

Charts

Weekly charts

Year-end charts

References

External links 
 Harvey E. (2013).  Jamie Lidell - "Jamie Lidell" (Warp).  Retrieved from:  http://www.spin.com/2013/02/jamie-lidell-jamie-lidell-warp/

2013 albums
Jamie Lidell albums
Warp (record label) albums